Ali Rashid Ahmad Lootah is the vice chairman of Mashreq bank and former chairman of Nakheel, a property development company in Dubai, United Arab Emirates.

Early life and career 
Lootah was born in 1960 in Dubai, and pursued his education in civil engineering at Clarkson University in the United States. He established the UAE Society of Engineers, in which he became a member of founding board.

He started his career working in the UAE's Ministry of Public Works, where he was later appointed as Assistant Under-secretary of the Ministry. Lootah was appointed as chairman of Nakheel in 2012 replacing Sultan Ahmed bin Sulayem, and led the new strategy for the company also restarting some of its development projects. He was replaced as chairman in 2020.

References

External links 
 Nakheel Website

People from Dubai
Living people
Businesspeople from Dubai
Emirati civil engineers
1960 births